The Queensland Labor Party (QLP) was a political party of Queensland, Australia formed in 1957 by a breakaway group of the then ruling Labor Party Government after the expulsion of Premier Vince Gair. In 1962 the party became the Queensland section of the Democratic Labor Party (DLP). The party continued to hold seats in the Queensland state parliament until 1972, then suffered a collapse in its vote and wound itself up in 1978.

History
In Queensland, Vince Gair became Labor leader and premier in 1952. 
 
The Central Executive of the ALP expelled Gair on 24 April 1957 because of his support of the Groupers. A total of 25 Labor MLAs left the party with him, including all the Cabinet except Deputy Premier Jack Duggan, to form the Queensland Labor Party. The two ex-Labor Independents joined the QLP. The ALP was left with 23 members with Duggan as leader. The Country and Liberal Parties had a combined 24 seats.

Gair tried to gain Country Party support for his minority government, but talks with Frank Nicklin broke down when federal Country Party leader Arthur Fadden (himself a Queenslander) told Nicklin that he had a chance to become Premier himself. On 12 June, the ALP, now led by Duggan, voted to deny "supply" (that is, the money needed to govern) to what was left of the Gair government. The Country-Liberal Coalition moved to block supply as well and brought the government down.

A state election was called for 3 August 1957. At that time, Queensland had a unicameral parliament which was elected by first-past-the-post rather than the present preferential voting system.  Since all sitting ALP and QLP members were opposed by a candidate from the other faction, the Labor vote was split in many seats. While the Coalition actually suffered a small swing against it, the large number of three-cornered contests resulted in the ALP and QLP losing seats to the Coalition. The two Labor factions won only 31 seats between them to the Coalition's 42 (up from 24 previously). The QLP won 23.4% of the vote, second behind Labor, and 11 of the 75 seats. Nicklin became Premier and for the first time in 25 years and only the second time since 1915, a Labor Government was out of office in Queensland. Gair himself was reelected in South Brisbane.

At the 1960 state election, the QLP won only four seats, with even Gair losing his seat. Gair stood for the Senate in 1961 for the QLP, but was unsuccessful. Gair's QLP merged with the Democratic Labor Party (DLP) in 1962 to become the Queensland branch of the DLP. However this decision split the state parliamentarians with two, Bunny Adair and Ted Walsh, opposing joining the DLP and instead becoming independent members. At the 1963 state election preferential voting was reintroduced. This enabled the DLP to not only draw votes away from the ALP, but also to direct their preferences to the Coalition. Gair became federal DLP leader in 1964, after his election to the Senate. From the 1963 election, the party's support in Queensland slipped below 8%, and the party retained only one seat in Queensland's unicameral parliament. The party's electoral support remained at about that level until the 1972 election when its last seat was lost in a redistribution. The DLP lost its raison d'être after 1972 when Labor won office at the federal level. At the time the state Country Party explored a merger with the DLP as part of a strategy of seeking greater unity with groups opposed to the federal Labor government, but this plan was soon abandoned. The DLP went into further decline in 1974 when Gair was forced to resign from the party as a result of the so-called Gair Affair. At the 1974 state election, the DLP did not contest all seats, and recorded only 1.91% of the vote. The DLP did not contest the 1977 state election and ceased to exist in 1978.

The ALP would remain in opposition in Queensland, even after the QLP and its successor the DLP had ceased to exist, returning to government in 1989 with Wayne Goss as leader.

Queensland election results
 In the 3 August 1957 Queensland election, the QLP won 23.4% of the vote, the second highest of the contesting parties, and won 11 seats in the Legislative Assembly.
 At the 28 May 1960 election, the QLP's vote dropped significantly to 12.28% and won only 4 seats in the Legislative Assembly.
 At the 1 June 1963 election the party's vote (now part of the DLP) had dropped further to 7.23% winning only 1 seat.
 At the 28 May 1966 election, the DLP won 6.25% of the vote and 1 seat.
 At the 17 May 1969 election, the DLP won 7.24% of the vote and 1 seat.
 At the 27 May 1972 election, the DLP won 7.69% of the vote and no seat.
 At the 7 December 1974 election, the DLP won 1.91% of the vote and no seat.
 By the 1977 election, the DLP did not contest the election and had ceased to exist in 1978.

QLP parliamentarians
Federal
Condon Byrne (Senate), 1957–58, 1968–74
Vince Gair (Senate), 1965–74

Legislative Assembly of Queensland
Bunny Adair (Cook), 1957–62 (left in opposition to joining the DLP)
Mick Brosnan (Fortitude Valley), 1957
Harold Collins (Tablelands), 1957
Viv Cooper (Keppel), 1957
George Devries (Gregory), 1957
Les Diplock (Condamine, Aubigny), 1957–72
Alfred Dohring (Roma), 1957
Charles English (Mulgrave), 1957
Tom Foley (Belyando), 1957–60
Vince Gair (South Brisbane), 1957–60
Mick Gardner (Rockhampton), 1957–60
Bob Gardner (Bulimba), 1957
Jim Hadley (Nundah), 1957
Paul Hilton (Carnarvon), 1957–63
Arthur Jones (Charters Towers), 1957–60
Greg Kehoe (Nash), 1957
Colin McCathie (Haughton), 1957–60
Bill Moore (Merthyr), 1957
Tom Moores (Kurilpa), 1957
Bill Power (Baroona), 1957–60
Tom Rasey (Windsor), 1957
Herbert Robinson (Sandgate), 1957
Alexander Skinner (Somerset), 1957
Norm Smith (Carpentaria), 1957–60
Ted Walsh (Bundaberg), 1957–62 (left in opposition to joining the DLP)

References

External links
 University of Western Australia Election Database
 House divided left Labor disarray

Australian Labor Party breakaway groups
Defunct political parties in Queensland
Political parties established in 1957
Political parties disestablished in 1978
1957 establishments in Australia
1978 disestablishments in Australia